Raaga Deepam is a 1982 Indian Telugu-language drama film, written and directed by Dasari Narayana Rao and produced by Kodali Bosu Babu under the banner of Veera Rani Enterprises. 

It stars Akkineni Nageswara Rao and Jayasudha in lead roles. It features original songs composed by Chakravarthy.

Plot
Chakravarthy, a musician, loves a beautiful girl Kalyani, the daughter of a millionaire Gopal Rao. Just before their marriage, an unforeseen situation arises, Chakravarthy meets his Master who brought him up. At that moment, he learns that Master's only daughter Gowri has become mentally sick as her father is unable to perform her marriage. To protect her, Master requests Chakravarthy to tell a lie that he is going to marry her, and to show his gratitude he does so. Afterward, Master realises that Chakravarthy's alliance is already fixed, so, he pleads with Kalyani to save his daughter when she too convinces Chakravarthy and makes him marry Gowri. Thereafter, Chakravarthy also performs Kalyani's marriage with a rich person Ranganath. Years roll by, the Chakravarthy couple is blessed with 2 children but unfortunately, Gowri is a vainglory woman who nags her husband and ill-treats everyone. Meanwhile, Chakravarthy spots Kalyani on the streets with a child when he finds out that Ranganath has abandoned her as Gopal Rao is bankrupt. At present, Chakravarthy gives her shelter which leads to several disputes & misunderstandings in his family. Here Gowri attributes the illicit relation between Chakravarthy & Kalyani when Kalyani leaves the house. Being aware of it, angered Chakravarthy chides Gowri and reveals the truth. Knowing it, eccentric Gowri too leaves the house as her husband does not have any love towards her except courtesy. On the other side, disturbed Kalyani commits suicide when Chakravarthy makes Gowri realise her mistake. Finally, the movie ends, Gowri asking for forgiveness and the couple adopting Kalyani's child.

Cast
Akkineni Nageswara Rao as Chakravarthy 
Jayasudha as Kalyani
Lakshmi as Gowri 
Rao Gopal Rao as Gopal Rao, Kalyani's father 
Gummadi as Master
Ranganath as Ranganath

Crew
Art: Bhaskar Raju
Choreography: Saleem 
Stills: Mohanji-Jaganji
Lyrics: C. Narayana Reddy, Veturi, Dasari Narayana Rao
Music: K. V. Mahadevan
Editing: B. Krishnam Raju
Cinematography: P. S. Selvaraj
Producer: Kodali Bosu Babu
Story - Screenplay - Dialogues - Director: Dasari Narayana Rao
Banner: Veera Rani Enterprises
Release Date: 15 January 1982

Soundtrack

Music composed by Chakravarthy. Music released on SEA Records Audio Company.

References

Indian drama films
Films directed by Dasari Narayana Rao
Films scored by K. Chakravarthy